Eurgrawn Wesleyaidd was a Welsh language periodical first published in Dolgellau by Richard Jones in 1809. Its contents, which included articles on religious subjects, literature, and philosophy and also poetry and biographies, were aimed at members of the Wesleyan Methodist Church. Its editors included Methodist ministers John Bryan (1776–1856) and Thomas Hughes (1854–1928).
 A product of the religious revival in Wales, where John and Charles Wesley and their followers preached widely, this magazine proved popular and was published in some form from 1809 until 1983.

References 

Periodicals published in Wales
Welsh-language magazines
Music magazines published in the United Kingdom